Starfish sites were large-scale night-time decoys created during the Blitz to simulate burning British cities. The aim was to divert German night bombers from their intended targets so they would drop their ordnance over the countryside. The sites were an extension of Colonel John Turner's decoy programme for airfields and factories (code named "Q" Sites, probably by analogy with Q-ships). Following the bombing, and near destruction, of Coventry in November 1940, Turner was tasked with creating decoys for seven major cities.

Turner referred to the new sites as "Special Fire" or "SF". However, one early site (near Bristol) was given the name "Starfish", which subsequently became used for all of the decoys. They consisted of elaborate light arrays and fires, controlled from a nearby bunker and laid out to simulate a fire-bombed town. By the end of the war there were 237 decoys protecting 81 towns and cities around the country.

Archaeological excavation in 1992 of the original "Starfish", in the Mendip Hills, found no evidence of bomb craters. Later research confirmed that Starfish sites did attract the attention of enemy bombers; one estimate is that around 968 tons of ordnance were dropped on the decoys.

Background
At the outbreak of World War II, the British government feared a German bombing campaign against the UK mainland. Colonel John Turner, an engineer and retired Air Ministry officer, was tasked, in September 1939, with establishing a broad range of day and night decoys to mislead enemy bombers. His initial work was with dummy aircraft, airfields and factories; the decoys for which were dubbed 'K' Sites. Turner also implemented night decoys; dubbed 'Q' Sites, they consisted of lights mounted on poles to simulate an airfield.

Decoy Fire Sites
In response to the Germans' use of incendiary bombs, Turner added fires to the 'Q' Sites, dubbing them Q-Fire or QF, to add to their plausibility. Initially very crude, the fires were controlled from a nearby concrete pillbox. The theory was that after a first wave of bombers dropped on the real target, the decoy would light fires to simulate the previous raid for further waves to home in on.

Special Fires
Following the night bombing of Coventry, in early November 1940, the decoy programme was expanded to include towns and cities; the Air Ministry initially ordered sites to be set up for Bristol, Crewe, Derby, London, Manchester, Middlesbrough and Sheffield. The new "Special Fire" decoys were set up to simulate the bomb drops of German pathfinder squadrons. By 23 January 1941 the programme had been increased to 43 sites protecting 13 town and cities and by March operational sites numbered over 100. By the end of the war there were 237 Starfish sites protecting 81 locations.

One of the first decoy sites was constructed on Black Down on the Mendip Hills; it was code-named "Starfish", derived from Turner's original SF code, and built to protect the nearby city of Bristol. The Starfish name was eventually adopted to describe all of the SF decoy sites. The Mendip Hills site used fires of creosote and water to simulate incendiary bombs exploding. In addition, glow boxes were used to simulate the streets and railways of Bristol; the light bulbs were powered by electrical generators turned by Coventry Climax petrol engines contained in two bunkers. Another of Bristol's sites was located in the parish of Yatton, North Somerset.

Glasgow was protected by various Starfish sites located on its surrounding hillsides. A decoy site existed at Long Wood at grid reference  outside Eaglesham in East Renfrewshire. Clusters of impressions where basket fires once stood, bounded by fire-break trenches, covered much of the area seen in Second World War photographs, and a prominent structure near the site may have been the decoy control bunker. Anti-aircraft gun emplacements have been noted at the site. Another site known as Craigmaddie lies on the Campsie Fells at Blairskaith Muir, . It was a co-located Starfish and QF/QL site. Carrington Moss, near Manchester, was another Starfish site.

As of 2000, there is a relatively intact control bunker for a co-located Starfish and Quick Light (QL) site at Liddington Hill overlooking Swindon.

Impact
A 1992 archaeological survey of the Mendip hills did not identify surviving bomb craters on the Black Down site (the original "Starfish"), despite claims of their existence. In his 2000 book, Fields of Deception: Britain's Bombing Decoys of World War II, historian Colin Dobinson collated Turner's conservative estimates as to the success of decoy sites; suggesting that Starfish decoys diverted 968 tons of German bombardment.

Germany 
The Germans also built large-scale night-time decoys such as the Krupp decoy site for the Krupp steel works in Essen.

See also
R Force

Notes

References

Bibliography

Further reading

External links
 Read about bombing decoys
 Decoy Sites – Wartime Deception in Norfolk and Suffolk by Huby Fairhead
 Night-Time Fire-Based Decoys by Fred Nash
 Read about the Bristol Civil Bombing Site C1H
 Bute at War The Isle of Bute had a decoy ('dummy') village located at the north end of the Island to confuse enemy bombers, and hopefully to draw them away from Greenock or Clydebank.
 
 
 Interessengemeinschaft museale Erschließung Baudenkmal Leitstand Kruppsche Nachtscheinanlage: Geschichte der Kruppschen Nachtscheinanlage in Velbert (German) Private Museum of Krupp-Works Decoy Site in Velbert (near Essen)

Military deception during World War II
Battle of Britain
United Kingdom home front during World War II